Sven Habermann (born November 3, 1961 in West Berlin, West Germany) is a former Canadian national soccer team goalkeeper, who was a member of the team that competed at the 1984 Summer Olympics in Los Angeles, California. Two years later he was on the Canadian roster at the 1986 FIFA World Cup in Mexico but did not see action.

Habermann played for the NASL Toronto Blizzard in 1983 and 1984.

Habermann played in the Canadian Soccer League for the Calgary Kickers.  He was named to the league's All-Star team as Calgary won the league play-off championship over the Hamilton Steelers.

Habermann was a member of the 1989 champion Vancouver 86ers team that, beginning from the previous season, set a North American professional sports record by going 46 consecutive games without defeat. 

He was named to the league's all-star team as Calgary won the league play-off championship.

Habermann appeared on an episode of Dragon's Den pitching a prototype pepper-spray delivery and self-defense system. All five Dragons bought into Habermann's pitch.

See also

 List of German Canadians

References
Canadian Olympic Committee

External links
 
 

1961 births
Living people
Footballers from Berlin
1986 FIFA World Cup players
Calgary Kickers players
Canada men's international soccer players
Canadian Soccer League (1987–1992) players
Canadian soccer players
Canadian people of German descent
Association football goalkeepers
Footballers at the 1984 Summer Olympics
German emigrants to Canada
Naturalized citizens of Canada
North American Soccer League (1968–1984) players
Olympic soccer players of Canada
Toronto Blizzard (1971–1984) players
Vancouver Whitecaps (1986–2010) players
Hamilton Steelers (1981–1992) players